Toro Loco: Sangriento a.k.a. Toro Loco: Bloodthirsty is a Chilean Dark Comedy film directed and written by Patricio Valladares. It features a mixed cast of relatively Well-known Chilean actors, including Francisco Melo, Constanza Piccoli, Simon Pesutic, Mauricio Pesutic, Cuentrejo.

Plot
A homeless man wanders the lands in search of revenge for the murder of his son. This man is a legend, a hit man, and they call him Toro Loco. He soon finds himself trapped in a city drowning in chaos, its people firmly in the grasp of a ruthless drug-peddling kingpin. With a clenched fist and his trademark six shooter, Toro Loco must battle his way to the top through an army of tough guys.

A Fistful of Dollars meets Death Wish by way of Blazing Saddles in this wild action/comedy from Chilean genre specialist Patricio Valladares (Hidden in the Woods). Delivering equal parts humor and blood, the story follows a grizzled stranger who arrives in a small town trapped in the grasp of a ruthless drug-peddling crime boss and his paraplegic, slobbering trigger-happy son. The man, known as Toro Loco, is in search for the killers of his son, yet never too busy to permanently take care of marauding punks and thugs who get in his way. With the support of a young beauty, her geeky brother and a trigger-happy drag queen he sets out to clean up the town and avenge the murder of his son. A fast-paced tale filled with memorable characters, imaginatively directed action scenes set and a deft comedic touch.

Cast
 Francisco Melo as Toro Loco
 Constanza Piccoli as Siboney
 Simon Pesutic as Jano
 Serge Francois Soto as Uncle Daddy
 Cuentrejo as Cuentrejo
 Matias Lopez as Danilo Porrasito
 Gonzalo Vivanco as Domingo
 Daniel Antivilo as Viejito Pastero
 Mauricio Pesutic as Baldemar
 Francisco "Chapu" Puelles as Toro Loco's Son
 Ignacio Muñoz as Lady Caca

References

Production
The filming began on July 24, 2014, in Chile, and ended in the mid-August.

Festival awards
Winner: Best Director, Buenos Aires Rojo Sangre Film Festival (Argentina)
Winner: Best Actor, Buenos Aires Rojo Sangre Film Festival (Argentina)

Selected festivals
2015 Morbido Film Festival (Mexico)
2015 Buenos Aires Rojo Sangre (Argentina)

Reception
Arsploitation Films has announced from Berlin (EFM) it has closed an all-rights North American deal for Chilean genre specialist Patricio Valladares’ action-comedy.

External links
 
 
 

Chilean comedy films
2015 films
Films directed by Patricio Valladares
Films shot in Chile
2010s Chilean films
2010s Spanish-language films